Down Home Blues is an album by blues musician Lightnin' Hopkins recorded in 1964 and released on the Bluesville label.

Reception

The Penguin Guide to Blues Recordings said "Gaskin and Lovelle's parts were probably added at overdub sessions. On Down Home Blues only "I Was Standing on 75 Highway" is Lightnin' at full strength".

Track listing
All compositions by Sam "Lightnin'" Hopkins 
 "Lets Go Sit On the Lawn" – 4:10
 "I Woke Up This Morning" – 5:50
 "I Got Tired" – 4:30
 "I Like to Boogie" – 3:50
 "I Asked the Bossman" – 6:40
 "I'm Taking a Devil of a Chance" – 3:50
 "Just a Wristwatch on My Arm" – 3:30
 "I Was Standing on 75 Highway" – 5:10
 "Get It Straight" – 1:30

Personnel

Performance
Lightnin' Hopkins – guitar, vocals
Leonard Gaskin – bass (tracks 1, 2, 8 & 9)
Herbie Lovelle – drums (tracks 1, 2, 8 & 9)

Production
Samuel Charters – producer
Rudy Van Gelder – engineer

References

Lightnin' Hopkins albums
1965 albums
Bluesville Records albums
Albums recorded at Van Gelder Studio